Charles Ingersoll may refer to:

Charles A. Ingersoll (1798–1860), American jurist
Charles Fortescue Ingersoll (1791–1832), Canadian businessman and politician
Charles Henry Ingersoll (1865–1948), American entrepreneur who co-founded the Ingersoll Watch Company in 1892
Charles Jared Ingersoll (1782–1862), American lawyer and legislator
Charles L. Ingersoll (1844–1895), American educator and president of Colorado State University
Charles Roberts Ingersoll (1821–1903), American state legislator and executive

See also
Ingersoll (surname)